Eremobina claudens, the dark-winged Quaker or Alberta Quaker, is a species of cutworm or dart moth in the family Noctuidae. It was first described by Francis Walker in 1857 and it is found in North America.

The MONA or Hodges number for Eremobina claudens is 9396.

References

Further reading

 
 
 

Noctuinae
Articles created by Qbugbot
Moths described in 1857